The Mustang Aeronautics Midget Mustang MM-1 is a single-seat aerobatic sports airplane developed and marketed in the United States for homebuilding. It is also known as the Long Midget. It was the predecessor to the Mustang II which is also known as the Bushby Mustang. Rights to both the Midget Mustang and the Mustang II were sold to Mustang Aeronautics in 1992.

Development
It is a low-wing cantilever monoplane of metal construction, primarily of 2024-T3 aluminum and most are fitted with fixed tailwheel undercarriage.  Developed by Piper engineer David Long in 1948, plans for production by Schweizer were underway at the time of Long's death two years later.  All rights and tooling were purchased by Robert Bushby in 1959, who built a 90 hp Continental powered example and sold plans and kits until 1992  when the rights were sold to Mustang Aeronautics. The Midget Mustang design being marketed in 2016 is similar to the original, with the option of building it with a bubble canopy in place of the straight line of the upper tailcone and hinged canopy of Long's original design, making it an M-IA.

Construction requires about 1000 hours of builder time.

Operational history
The Midget Mustang was intended for air racing. David Long designed an aircraft for a friend to be used in the Cleveland Air Race in 1948.  That aircraft was built by Long and was named "Pea Shooter".  The Midget Mustang was only moderately successful as a race plane.  However, its appearance and desirable flight characteristics made it an ideal sport plane. At the Cleveland Race, racers competed in aircraft with names like, "Mammy","Miss Fort Worth", and "Slo Poke". Over time, air racers modified the aircraft to reach 181 mph (291 km/h) speeds in competition. Nowadays, the Midget Mustang can cruise at 240 mph.

Variants
Midget Mustang
"GG"
A tricycle gear modification
Graham Super Midget
Features a manually retracted landing gear.

Specifications (MM-1-125)

See also

References

External links

 Manufacturer's website

1940s United States sport aircraft
Homebuilt aircraft
Midget Mustang
Low-wing aircraft
Single-engined tractor aircraft
Aerobatic aircraft
Aircraft first flown in 1948